Van Buren/1st Avenue station and Van Buren/Central Avenue station, also known as Central Station, is a pair of Valley Metro Rail stations in Downtown Phoenix, Arizona. Despite having at least four different names, it is all actually one facility, which serves as a stop for various city buses.

The rail station is the 17th stop westbound and the 12th stop eastbound on the initial line segment.

Ridership

Passenger counts shown here are the combined ridership from both the 1st Avenue and Central Avenue platforms.

Notable nearby places
 Hotel San Carlos
 Valley Youth Theatre
 Herberger Theater Center
 ASU Downtown Complex
 Chase Tower
 Freeport-McMoRan Center
 Civic Space Park

References

External links
 Valley Metro map

Valley Metro Rail stations in Phoenix, Arizona
Railway stations in the United States opened in 2008
2008 establishments in Arizona